Terry Crawford may refer to:

Terrayne Crawford, an American actress,
Terri Crawford, a Canadian rock singer and children's entertainer.